Talal Al Qahtani (Arabic:طلال القحطاني) (born 15 December 1987) is a Qatari footballer who played in the Qatar Stars League for Lekhwiya.

References

External links
 

Qatari footballers
1987 births
Living people
Lekhwiya SC players
Al-Rayyan SC players
Qatar Stars League players
Association football defenders